Nodar Dzhordzhikiya (or Nodar Jorjikia) (Georgian: ნოდარ ჯორჯიკია, ; November 15, 1921 in Kutaisi – June 1, 2008) was a Soviet basketball player who competed for the Soviet Union in the 1952 Summer Olympics. He trained at Dynamo in Tbilisi.

Dzhordzhikiya was a member of the Soviet team which won the silver medal at the 1952 Games. He played in all eight matches.

References

External links
 Nodar Dzhordzhikiya's profile at databaseOlympics
 Nodar Dzhordzhikiya's obituary 

1921 births
2008 deaths
Sportspeople from Kutaisi
Men's basketball players from Georgia (country)
Soviet men's basketball players
Olympic basketball players of the Soviet Union
Olympic silver medalists for the Soviet Union
Basketball players at the 1952 Summer Olympics
Dynamo sports society athletes
Olympic medalists in basketball

Medalists at the 1952 Summer Olympics